is a Japanese poet, writer, critic, and lecturer. He is considered one of the driving forces behind contemporary Japanese poetry.

Literary style
The work of Nomura "plays with language in radical and diverse ways, employing subtleties of rhythm, semantics, image, gender, punctuation, and repetition, often all within the same short stanza." Forrest Gander, co-translator of Kiwao Nomura’s poetry, noted in an interview, "What we find in innovative Japanese poetries like Gozo Yoshimasu's and Kiwao Nomura's has, as far as I know, no equivalents in contemporary poetry in English. The mix of the philosophical and the whimsical makes for a tone that is absolutely weird to Westerners."
According to Poetry International Web, "In all such experiments, Nomura shows himself to be very much in search of a center of gravity where the almost ritual repetitions and revisitations of captivating sounds and (often erotic) images dissolve of their own accord into the night, darkness, nothingness, the end of a delirium."
Publishers Weekly concludes that Nomura's poems "succeed through astonishment, shock, and disorder, almost in the manner of Kathy Acker or William S. Burroughs."

Published works

Books of poetry translated in English
 Spectacle & Pigsty: Selected Poems of Kiwao Nomura. Translated by Kyoko Yoshida and Forrest Gander. Richmond, CA: Omnidawn Publishing, 2011. .
 The Day Laid Bare. Translated by Eric Selland. Tokyo & London: Isobar Press, 2020. .

Books of poetry in Japanese (a selection)
 川萎え [Dried River], 1987
 反復彷徨 [Repeated Roams], 1992
 特性のない陽のもとに [Under the Sun without Character], 1993
 風の配分 [Distribution of the Wind], 1999
 ニューインスピレーション [New Inspiration], 2003
 スペクタクル [Spectacle], 2006
 plan14, 2007
 Z O L O, 2009
 Cafe spiral ou une heure en enfer [with images by Kenji Kitagawa]

Collaborative books of poetry
 馬を野に放つ. (co-authored by Jan Lauwereyns, with images by Kris Martin; bilingual edition with a Dutch translation by Jan Lauwereyns) [Loose a Horse in the Field] Ghent, Belgium: Druksel, 2011.

Awards
 Rekitei Prize for Young Poets
 Takami Jun Prize
 2012 Best Translated Book Award, Spectacle & Pigsty
 2020 The Japan Poets Association 38th Modern Poetry Prize for 薄明のサウダージ（Twilight Saudade, 2019)

References

External links
  
 Omnidawn
 Alligatorzine
 Poetry International Web
 International Writing Program, University of Iowa

1951 births
Living people
People from Saitama Prefecture
International Writing Program alumni
20th-century Japanese poets